Chandan Ram Das is an Indian politician and member of the Bharatiya Janata Party. Das is a member of the Uttarakhand Legislative Assembly from the Bageshwar constituency in Bageshwar district since 2007.

References 

People from Bageshwar district
Bharatiya Janata Party politicians from Uttarakhand
Uttarakhand MLAs 2022–2027
Living people
Uttarakhand MLAs 2017–2022
Year of birth missing (living people)